Thomas Marbury was the High Sheriff of Cheshire, serving in that position from 9 December 1620 to 16 November 1621. He was MP for Cheshire for the Second Protectorate Parliament.

In 1638 his daughter Mary [died 1658] married John Bradshaw.

Marbury was heir to the manor of Marbury, Cheshire. Siding with the Parliamentarians, he raised troops for the Battle of Nantwich of 1644. It was widely suspected that Marbury was not a military man himself. 

Thomas Marbury was among several Cheshire Parliamentarians to be pardoned by Charles II in 1651.

He served in the Second Protectorate Parliament from 17 September 1656, to 26 June 1657.

References

English MPs 1656–1658
High Sheriffs of Cheshire
17th-century English people